Reggie Brian Martin is an Australian politician. He has been a Labor member of the South Australian Legislative Council since the 2022 state election.

Martin was born in Port Adelaide and was educated at Taperoo High School and the University of Adelaide. He became an official in the Shop, Distributive and Allied Employees Association and rose to become assistant secretary of the state Labor Party in 2011 and state secretary from 2012.

References

Year of birth missing (living people)
Living people
Members of the South Australian Legislative Council
Australian Labor Party members of the Parliament of South Australia
21st-century Australian politicians